The Alexandria Township School District is a comprehensive community public school district consisting of two school facilities serving students in pre-kindergarten through eighth grade from Alexandria Township, in Hunterdon County, New Jersey, United States.

As of the 2021–22 school year, the district, comprised of two schools, had an enrollment of 461 students and 49.0 classroom teachers (on an FTE basis), for a student–teacher ratio of 9.4:1.

The district is classified by the New Jersey Department of Education as being in District Factor Group "GH", the third-highest of eight groupings. District Factor Groups organize districts statewide to allow comparison by common socioeconomic characteristics of the local districts. From lowest socioeconomic status to highest, the categories are A, B, CD, DE, FG, GH, I and J.

Students in public school for ninth through twelfth grades attend Delaware Valley Regional High School, together with students from Frenchtown, Holland Township, Kingwood Township and Milford. The school is part of the Delaware Valley Regional High School District. As of the 2021–22 school year, the high school had an enrollment of 719 students and 62.5 classroom teachers (on an FTE basis), for a student–teacher ratio of 11.5:1.

Schools
The two schools in the district (with 2021–22 enrollment data from the National Center for Education Statistics) are:
Lester D. Wilson School with 187 students in pre-kindergarten through third grade
Katherine Griffth, Interim Principal
Alexandria Middle School with 269 students in grades four through eight
Kevin McPeek, Principal

Administration
Core members of the district's administration are:
Kevin McPeek, Superintendent of Schools
Jack Trent, School Business Administrator / Board Secretary

Board of education
The district's board of education is comprised of nine members. As a Type II school district, the board's trustees are elected directly by  voters to serve three-year terms of office on a staggered basis, with three seats up for election each year held (since 2012) as part of the November general election. The board appoints a superintendent to oversee the district's day-to-day operations and a business administrator to supervise the business functions of the district.

References

External links
Alexandria Township School District

School Data for the Alexandria Township School District, National Center for Education Statistics
Delaware Valley Regional High School District

Alexandria Township, New Jersey
New Jersey District Factor Group GH
School districts in Hunterdon County, New Jersey